Jimmy Yu (born 1968), also known as Guo Gu (果谷 Guǒ Gǔ), is a Chan teacher and a scholar of Buddhism. He was the bassist for the American 1980s hardcore bands Death Before Dishonor (the original) and Judge. After his youthful days in hardcore straight edge, he returned to Buddhism and became a monk under Chan Master Sheng Yen. In 2000, he left monasticism to pursue academia. He received an MA degree in Chinese Buddhist studies from University of Kansas in 2002 and a Ph.D. from Princeton University's Department of Religion in 2008.

He is currently an Associate Professor of Religion at Florida State University, teaching courses in East Asian religious traditions, especially Chinese Buddhism and late imperial Chinese cultural history. His research interests include the cultural history of the body, Buddhist monasticism, Chan/Zen Buddhism, and popular religions within the broader context of fifteenth- to seventeenth-centuries China.

Jimmy Yu is also a long-time practitioner of Chan; his Dharma name is 果谷 Guǒ Gǔ. He practiced with the late Chan Master Sheng Yen from 1982 until the latter died in 2009. Guo Gu was Sheng Yen's translator, attendant, and assistant in leading intense Chan retreats. He first received inka, a seal of approval for his experience of Chan, in 1995 by Sheng Yen, and subsequently received several inkas from him, the last one being in 2007. He is the founder and Dharma teacher of the Tallahassee Chan Center in Tallahassee, Florida, and founder of the Dharma Relief project. 
Additionally, Jimmy Yu is also the author of academic books, such as Sanctity and Self-Inflicted Violence in Chinese Religions (2012) and Reimagining Chan Buddhism: Sheng Yen and the Creation of the Dharma Drum Lineage of Chan (2022). This former explores the religious aspects of self-inflicted violence, such as texts written in blood and the occasional practice of cannibalism during times of famine in late Ming and early Qing China, and the latter is the first socio-intellectual history of the Dharma Drum Lineage of Chan (Zen) by Master Sheng Yen, challenging the received academic and popular image of Chan Buddhism as a meditation school that bypasses scriptural learning.

Books
 Yu, Jimmy, Sanctity and Self-Inflicted Violence in Chinese Religions, 1500–1700, Oxford University Press, 2012. 
 Guo Gu, Passing Through the Gateless Barrier: Kōan Practice for Real Life, Shambhala Publications, 2016. 
 Guo Gu, The Essence of Chan: A Guide to Life and Practice according to the Teachings of Bodhidharma, Shambhala Publications, 2020  (first paperback edition);  (eBook edition, 2012)
 Guo Gu, Silent Illumination: A Chan Buddhist Path to Natural Awakening, Shambhala Publications, 2021 
 Yu, Jimmy, Reimagining Chan Buddhism: Sheng Yen and the Creation of the Dharma Drum Lineage of Chan, Routledge, 2022.

References
 Ryan J. Downey "Biography: Judge." AMG Retrieved 19 May 2010
 Tim McMahon and Gordo of Double Cross "Parts I ~ VI." Retrieved 2 January 2011

Notes

American heavy metal bass guitarists
American male bass guitarists

Florida State University faculty

Chan Buddhists
Zen Buddhist spiritual teachers
1968 births

Living people